Miroslav Pejić (born 16 February 1986) is a Croatian retired footballer, who last played for Panargiakos.

Club career
Pejić had a spell in the Singapore Premier league with Warriors.

References

External links
 Miroslav Pejić profile at Nogometni Magazin 
 

1986 births
Living people
People from Derventa
Croats of Bosnia and Herzegovina
Association football forwards
Croatian footballers
NK Zagreb players
NK Lučko players
Hapoel Ramat Gan F.C. players
NK Samobor players
Warriors FC players
NK Zagorec Krapina players
NK Brežice 1919 players
Panargiakos F.C. players
Croatian Football League players
Israeli Premier League players
First Football League (Croatia) players
Singapore Premier League players
Slovenian Second League players
Gamma Ethniki players
Croatian expatriate footballers
Expatriate footballers in Israel
Croatian expatriate sportspeople in Israel
Expatriate footballers in Singapore
Croatian expatriate sportspeople in Singapore
Expatriate footballers in Slovenia
Croatian expatriate sportspeople in Slovenia
Expatriate footballers in Greece
Croatian expatriate sportspeople in Greece